Jim Tredger is a Canadian politician, who was elected to in the Yukon Legislative Assembly in the 2011 election. He represented the electoral district of Mayo-Tatchun as a member of the Yukon New Democratic Party caucus from 2011 to 2016.

Prior to elected office, Tredger served as president of both the Association of Yukon School Administrators and the Yukon Teachers Association. He has also sat on the boards of the Canadian Association of Principals, Yukon College, United Way Yukon and Food for Learning Yukon.

During his term in office, Tredger served as the NDP critic for education, energy, mines and resources, and rural issues. He was defeated by Liberal candidate Don Hutton in the 2016 Yukon general election.

Tredger is married with four children and four grandchildren.

Electoral record

2016 general election

|-

| Liberal
| Don Hutton
| align="right"| 331
| align="right"| 45.3%
| align="right"| +18.6%
|-

| NDP
| Jim Tredger
| align="right"| 233
| align="right"| 31.9%
| align="right"| -9.8%

|-
! align left colspan=3|Total
! align=right| 730
! align=right| 100.0%
! align=right| –
|}

2011 general election

|-

| NDP
| Jim Tredger
| align="right"| 282
| align="right"| 41.7%
| align="right"| +24.2%

| Liberal
| Eric Fairclough
| align="right"| 181
| align="right"| 26.7%
| align="right"| -26.5%
|-
! align left colspan=3|Total
! align=right| 677
! align=right| 100.0%
! align=right|
|}

References

Yukon New Democratic Party MLAs
Living people
21st-century Canadian politicians
Year of birth missing (living people)